First-seeded Helen Jacobs defeated Carolin Babcock 6–2, 6–2 in the final to win the women's singles tennis title at the 1932 U.S. National Championships.

Seeds
The tournament used two lists of players for seeding the women's singles event; one list of eight U.S. players and a list for three foreign players. Helen Jacobs is the champion; others show in brackets the round in which they were eliminated.

  Helen Jacobs (champion)
  Anna McCune Harper (quarterfinals)
  Marjorie Morrill (quarterfinals)
  Josephine Cruickshank  (third round)
  Sarah Palfrey (first round)
  Carolin Babcock (finalist)
  Virginia Hilleary (third round)
  Marjorie Gladman Van Ryn (quarterfinals)
  Elsie Goldsack Pittman (semifinals)
  Joan Ridley (semifinals)
  Marjorie Leeming (third round)

Draw

Final eight

References

External links
 Getty Images footage of the final

1932
1932 in women's tennis
1932 in American women's sports
Women's Singles